Rick Dowswell (born 21 January 1951) is a Canadian athlete. He competed in the men's javelin throw at the 1972 Summer Olympics.

References

1951 births
Living people
Athletes (track and field) at the 1972 Summer Olympics
Athletes (track and field) at the 1974 British Commonwealth Games
Commonwealth Games competitors for Canada
Athletes (track and field) at the 1971 Pan American Games
Pan American Games track and field athletes for Canada
Canadian male javelin throwers
Olympic track and field athletes of Canada
Sportspeople from Sarnia